Athlitikos Syllogos Poseidon Nea Michaniona is a Greek football club based in Michaniona, Greece.

Honours

National
 Fourth Tier Champions: 3
 1983-84, 1990-91, 2020-21

Domestic
 Macedonia FCA Champions: 3
 1981–82, 1988–89, 2018–19
 Macedonia FCA Cup Winners: 1
 1994-95

References

Football clubs in Central Macedonia
Thessaloniki (regional unit)
Association football clubs established in 1903
1947 establishments in Greece
Gamma Ethniki clubs